Henry Aloysius McDevitt (1904 – 4 January 1966) was an Irish Fianna Fáil politician and barrister. He was elected, at his second attempt, to Dáil Éireann as a Teachta Dála (TD) for the Donegal East constituency at the 1938 general election. He did not contest the 1943 general election.

McDevitt's grandson is Mark Reckless, former MP for Rochester and Strood in the UK Parliament (2010–2015), and was a Member of the Senedd for South Wales East, from 2016 to 2021.

References

1904 births
1966 deaths
Fianna Fáil TDs
Members of the 10th Dáil
Politicians from County Donegal
Irish barristers
20th-century Irish lawyers